Halal syndrome is a rare disorder characterised by microcephaly, cleft palate, and variable other anomalies.

References

External links 

Congenital disorders
Syndromes